Bartleby is a 1970 British drama film directed by Anthony Friedman and starring Paul Scofield, John McEnery and Thorley Walters. It is an adaptation of the short story "Bartleby, the Scrivener; A Story of Wall-street" by Herman Melville. The film relocates the narrative from New York in the 1850s to London in the 1970s.

It was shot at Twickenham Studios and on location around London. The sets were designed by the art director Simon Holland.

Plot
Bartleby, a young audit clerk, is defeated by the pressures of modern life; he gradually opts out of all forms of social engagement and withdraws into his own world.

Cast
 Paul Scofield - The Accountant
 John McEnery - Bartleby
 Thorley Walters - The Colleague
 Colin Jeavons - Tucker
 Raymond Mason - Landlord
 Charles Kinross - Tenant
 Neville Barber - First Client
 Robin Askwith - Office Boy
 Hope Jackman - Hilda - Tealady
 John Watson - Doctor
 Christine Dingle - Patient
 Rosalind Elliot - Miss Brown - Secretary
 Tony Parkin - Dickinson - Clerk

Critical reception
The TV Guide reviewer commented that "the film is brooding, slow, and annoying at times, but the vision of McEnery as Bartleby is not easily forgotten. Scofield...gives a supremely intelligent portrayal of a man caught between logic and emotion."

Stanley Kauffmann of The New Republic wrote about Bartleby- "a poor film but with superb acting in it".

References

External links

1970 films
1970 drama films
British drama films
Films based on works by Herman Melville
Films set in London
Films shot at Twickenham Film Studios
1970s English-language films
1970s British films